The Seram honeyeater (Lichmera monticola) is a species of bird in the family Meliphagidae.
It is endemic to Indonesia, where it occurs on Seram in the southern Maluku Islands. Its natural habitat is subtropical or tropical moist montane forests.

References

Seram honeyeater
Birds of Seram
Endemic fauna of Seram Island
Seram honeyeater
Taxonomy articles created by Polbot